The Yavuz-Sultan-Selim Mosque is a religious building in Mannheim, Germany, named for Selim I. Until 2008 it was the biggest mosque in Germany, and  attracts up to 3,000 Muslims every weekend.

Since the mosque was opened in 1995, Muslim shops and youth centers have become a magnet for the Muslim community.

See also 
Islam in Germany
 List of mosques in Germany

References 

1995 establishments in Germany
Buildings and structures in Mannheim
Mosques completed in 1995
Mosques in Germany
DITIB mosque